Andrew Ian Henry Russell, 15th Duke of Bedford (born 30 March 1962) is a British peer and landowner. His main estate is based at Woburn Abbey in Bedfordshire.

Life
The eldest son of Henry Robin Ian Russell, 14th Duke of Bedford, and his wife, Henrietta Tiarks, Bedford was educated at Hall School, Hampstead and Heatherdown School, near Ascot in Berkshire, followed by Harrow School and Harvard, where he received his BA degree. He was known as Lord Howland until his grandfather's death in 2002, when he adopted the courtesy title Marquess of Tavistock, previously held by his father, Robin Russell, 14th Duke of Bedford. 

He has two younger brothers, Robin and James.

On 13 June 2003 he succeeded to the Dukedom of Bedford when his father suffered a fatal stroke, also becoming 15th Marquess of Tavistock, 19th Earl of Bedford, 17th Baron Russell of Thornhaugh, and 15th Baron Howland of Streatham.

Personal life
On 16 October 2000, at St Margaret's Church, Westminster, Lord Howland (as he then was) married Louise Rona Crammond, a daughter of Donald Ian Crammond.

They have two children: 
 Lady Alexandra Lucy Clare Russell (b. 9 July 2001)
 Henry Robin Charles Russell, Marquess of Tavistock (b. London, Greater London, Middlesex, 7 June 2005)

Styles
1962–2002: Lord Howland
2002–2003: Marquess of Tavistock 
2003: His Grace The Duke of Bedford

References

415
1962 births
Living people
People educated at The Hall School, Hampstead
People educated at Harrow School
People educated at Heatherdown School
Harvard University alumni
A